Malthouse Theatre is the resident theatre company of The Malthouse building in Southbank, part of the Melbourne Arts Precinct. In the 1980s it was known as the Playbox Theatre Company and was housed in the Playbox Theatre in Melbourne's CBD.

A multidisciplinary contemporary theatre, Malthouse Theatre produces and/or presents many productions annually, from drama and comedy to contemporary opera, music theatre and cabaret, to contemporary dance and physical theatre. The Company regularly co-produces with local and national performing arts companies and tours nationally and internationally. 

Malthouse Theatre productions have been performed internationally includingthe Solaris, a new play by David Greig adapted from Stanisław Lem’s novel at The Royal Lyceum Theatre in Edinburgh, in 2019 and Picnic at Hanging Rock, in 2018 adapted by Tom Wright and directed by Matthew Lutton at the Barbican Centre in London. 

Nationally touring works include th production Wake in Fright in 2019, adapted from Kenneth Cook’s novel by Declan Greene with Zahra Newman, and the record-breaking box office production of Cloudstreet adapted by Nick Enright and Justin Monjo from the novel by Tim Winton.

History

Founding
Malthouse Theatre had its beginnings as ‘Hoopla!’ in 1976 when Carrillo Gantner AC, Graeme Blundell and Garrie Hutchinson formed the Hoopla Theatre Foundation. In 1980 the name was changed to Playbox Theatre Company after moving to the Playbox Theatre at 55 Exhibition Street, before it was destroyed by fire in 1984. In 2004, Michael Kantor reimagined Playbox as Malthouse Theatre after the historic venue that has been the company's home since 1990.

Malthouse building

Original uses 
The Malthouse was built in 1882 by the Castlemaine Brewery, then one of the largest in Australia, to supply its brewery on nearby Queensbridge Street. The building was constructed by Nicholas and Edward Fitzgerald, with their managing director J.B. Perrins to establish the South Melbourne Branch of the Castlemaine Brewery. It was built in the Victorian Industrial era and style.

The three storey malthouse building was converted into a theatre in the 1980s. On the front facing façade, blind arcading were modified to create window openings on the second floor level. A steel roof with unique ventilation monitors tops the building.

Other important features include unpainted decorative bricks with contrasting colours for pilasters and horizontal banding at first and second floor levels, which create a visual separation between floors. However, on the side elevation, the brickwork is uniform across all pilasters and banding.

It was later leased to Barrett Bros & Burston & Co. who also operated the large malting works on the Yarra River in Richmond, known for the large silos and Nylex sign. By the 1970s it had ceased operating and had been painted white and lost much of its architectural detail.

As theatre 

The then owners Carlton & United Breweries in 1986 donated the building to Playbox Theatre Company to refurbish as their permanent home. After years of fundraising and construction, The CUB Malthouse theatre complex opened officially on 25 August 1990. The Beckett Theatre had opened 16 March 1990 with The Forty Lounge Cafe by Tes Lyssiotis and The Merlyn Theatre 28 May 1990 with Cafe Fledermaus by Robyn Archer. The ribbon was cut by a representative group of 12 people. These included John Beckett (designer), Hannie Rayson (playwright), Julia Blake (actress), Robert Taylor (production manager), Ailsa Piper (Board Member), Serena Burchell (Box Office), David Roberts (actor), Richard Jeziorny (designer), Ross Murray (stage manager), Stuart Greenbaum (composer), Jill Smith (CEO), and Carrillo Gantner (Artistic Director & Co-Founder). Campbell mcComas as "The Spirit of the Theatre" was MC.  In 2014 the building was renamed The Coopers Malthouse, and then again to The Malthouse in 2020.

The Malthouse is a heritage listed building and contains several unique indoor and outdoor spaces. This includes three theatres—the 500-seat Merlyn Theatre (named after philanthropist Merlyn Myer), the 175-seat Beckett Theatre (named after designer John Beckett) and the 100-seat flexible space The Tower. Inside, the building also houses a café and bar, the Bagging Room, Hoopla! Room, Shell Room and administrative offices. 

Directly outside is The Malthouse's Courtyard, and a Forecourt which is shared with the Australian Centre for Contemporary Art (ACCA), Chunky Move and the Victorian College of the Arts. Malthouse Theatre's scenic workshop is located in the neighbouring ACCA building, completed in 2002, which also includes rehearsal spaces for Chunky Move, a Melbourne-based contemporary dance company.

The Malthouse venue hosts over 100 external hirer events annually ranging from festivals, performances, conferences, rehearsals and workshops. This includes large-scale festivals such as Melbourne International Arts Festival, Asia TOPA and Sugar Mountain Festival. Since 2016, The Malthouse has been a part of the Melbourne International Comedy Festival, programming over 20 diverse comedic acts each year.

Artistic Team 

Malthouse Theatre’s core artistic team is currently led by Artistic Director & Co-CEO Matthew Lutton and Executive Producer & Co-CEO Sarah Neal. It also includes Bridget Balodis (Director in Resident), Ra Chapman (Resident Artist), Jada Alberts (Resident Artist) and Kamarra Bell-Wykes (Resident Artist).

Board of Directors & Artistic Directors 

Malthouse Theatre’s current Board members includes Fiona McGauchie (Chair), Michael Kantor (Deputy Chair), Debbie Dadon AM, Andrew Myer AM, Jan Owen AM, Sue Prestney, Pamela Rabe, Nick Schlieper, Mary Vallentine AO and Deborah Cheetham.

Malthouse Theatre’s Artistic Directors 
2015 – present Matthew Lutton
2010 – 2015 Marion Potts
2004 – 2010 Michael Kantor
1993 – 2004 Aubrey Mellor OAM
1988 – 1993 Carrillo Gantner AC

Malthouse Theatre Productions

Season 2020 
The Importance of Being Earnest, Grey Arias*, Macbeth (This Ignorant Present)*, K-BOX*, Is This A Room: Reality Winner Verbatim Transcription*, Do not go gentle…*, The Return*, Prima Facie*, Go To Hell*, Loaded
( *Season 2020 productions cancelled as a result of the global COVID-19 pandemic.)

Season 2019 
Underground Railroad Game, Barbara and the Camp Dogs, The Temple, Cloudstreet, Wake in Fright, Solaris, My Dearworthy Darling, Australian Realness, Apocalypse Meow: Crisis is Born

Season 2018 
Picnic at Hanging Rock, Good Muslim Boy, A Pacifist’s Guide to the War on Cancer, Bliss, Going Down, Brothers Wreck, Blackie Blackie Brown: The Traditional Owner of Death, Melancholia, Blasted, Ich Nibber Dibber, Trustees

Season 2017 
The Encounter, Little Emperors, The Homosexuals or ‘Faggots’, Piece for Person and Ghetto Blaster, Away, Wild Bore, Revolt. She said. Revolt again., Heart is a Wasteland, You're Not Alone, The Real and Imagined History of the Elephant Man, Black Rider: The Casting of the Magic Bullets, The Testament of Mary

Season 2016 
Meow Meow's Little Mermaid, Picnic at Hanging Rock, Every Brilliant Thing, The Glass Menagerie, The Events, Come Away with Me to the End of the World, Edward II, The Fiery Maze, Gonzo, War and Peace (Around a Kitchen Table), Blaque Showgirls

Season 2015 
Blak Cabaret, Wot? No Fish!!, Depth of Field, Nothing to Lose, Do You Speak Chinese?, Love and Information, Meme Girls, Timeshare, Antigone, I Am a Miracle, A Social Service, They Saw a Thylacine, The Listies Ruin Xmas

Season 2014 
The Government Inspector, Frankenstein, Night on Bald Mountain, Ugly Mugs, The Witches, The Good Person of Szechuan, The Book of Loco, Walking into the Bigness, The Riders, Hello, Goodbye & Happy Birthday, Calpurnia Descending

References

Theatres in Melbourne
Theatre companies in Australia
Buildings and structures in the City of Melbourne (LGA)
Theatres completed in 1990
1990 establishments in Australia
Southbank, Victoria